William Talbert Morris (March 10, 1924–September 25, 1993) was a Republican member of the Kansas state legislature. He was originally elected to the Kansas House of Representatives in 1972, and served two terms there before running successfully for the Kansas State Senate in 1976. He spent 16 years in the Senate, and was succeeded by Michael Terry Harris.

References

1924 births
1993 deaths
Republican Party Kansas state senators
Republican Party members of the Kansas House of Representatives
Politicians from Wichita, Kansas
20th-century American politicians